Leptodactylus mystaceus is a species of frog in the family Leptodactylidae. It is also known as the common toad-frog.

It is found in northern South America. Its natural habitats are subtropical or tropical moist lowland forests, moist savanna, subtropical or tropical seasonally wet or flooded lowland grassland, intermittent freshwater marshes, pastureland, and heavily degraded former forest. It is not considered threatened by the IUCN.

References

mystaceus
Amphibians of Bolivia
Amphibians of Brazil
Amphibians of Colombia
Amphibians of Ecuador
Amphibians of French Guiana
Amphibians of Guyana
Amphibians of Peru
Amphibians of Suriname
Amphibians of Venezuela
Taxonomy articles created by Polbot
Amphibians described in 1824